Cynthia Udoka Osokogu was a Nigerian woman who was stalked on Facebook, lured from her residence in Abuja to a Lagos hotel under the pretext of business, then drugged, tied up, robbed, raped, beaten and strangled to death in 2012.

Background
Cynthia was born on 10 November 1987 in Agbor town, Delta State. Cynthia Osokogu was the last child and only daughter of her parents, retired major-general Frank Osokogu and Joy-Rita Nkem Osokogu. She had three elder brothers. Her eldest brother is Flight Lieutenant Kenneth Uchechukwu Osokogu. Her immediate elder brother is an Assistant Superintendent of Customs, Mr. Williams Ehiedu Osokogu. Her third elder brother, Mr. Tony Azubike Osokogu, lived in Greece.
She started schooling at the Command Children School, Ilorin and moved to the Command Secondary School, Jos from 1997 to 2004. She was a graduate of English Language at Nasarawa State University and was pursuing a master's degree in Public Administration in the same institution after resigning from a job with MTN. Cynthia was also a former model. She owned a boutique 'Dress Code' which she opened in Keffi, a town in Nasarawa State in 2007. She was described as hardworking, loving and industrious by her family. She had achieved much by age 24.

Incident
Cynthia developed some friendships via  the social networking site Facebook after chatting with a newly added “friend”, Okwumi Echezona Nwabufor via her BlackBerry Messenger over the pace of about four months and soon she had also "friended" his cousin, Ezike Ilechukwu Olisaeloka. Even though she already had a relation in the United States who often sent her goods to sell in her retailing business, they told her they were in the same business, that they were also retailers and offered to sell her the items at cheaper prices. She believed them. These young men seemed normal and promised to host Cynthia when she came to Lagos. What Cynthia didn't know was that Nwabufor had been stalking her for months, patiently gaining her confidence through frequent chats and postings. When she informed them she usually comes to buy goods in Lagos, they made arrangements for her visit while promising to help her get the goods at cheaper prices. The trip was organized by Echezona Nwabufor, one of the two new friends. On July 21, 2012, Cynthia flew to Lagos from Abuja to meet with these new "retailers" regarding the better price offer on the clothes and accessories for her fashion boutique. After landing, she called her mother to tell her that she had arrived safely.

The two young men picked Cynthia up from the Murtala Muhammed International Airport, Ikeja, and drove her to Cosmilla Hotel in  Lakeview estate in Festac Town. At the hotel, they entertained her and offered her a Ribena-brand drink which was pre-drugged with Rohypnol), but discovered the drug did not take effect quickly enough on her. After that, they beat her and demanded she reveal where she kept her money. They presumed she would hold a lot of money, but she said she didn't have any money to spare. When they didn't get any money from her, they tied her up, robbed her of all the money she brought to shop for her business, her three blackberry phones, jewelries, international passport, a drivers’ licence, then they raped her and finally strangled her to death.
The next morning, after having spent the night with Cynthia's body, they then abandoned her, left the hotel and quickly unfriended her from their Facebook friends list to remove any trace of their connection. Unknown to them, there was a hidden CCTV camera in the hotel which recorded part of the event.

According to the hotel receptionist's account (Ms. Ifeyinwa Njebu), the two checked in at the hotel at 8 a.m. on July 21, 2012. By the time they checked out, she had handed over to the second receptionist (Vivian Anuonye), who had taken over duty; so she asked her to check them out. They checked in again (with Cynthia) at the hotel at about 12 a.m. on July 21, 2012. When Ms. Njebu resumed the next day by July 22, Vivian handed over to her and gave her details about the room already occupied.
The room that Ms Njebu checked in the couple was to expire on July 22, 12 noon. After the two left in the morning, his brother came to take over the room. So she noted that and she was also aware that the other person was still occupying the room. Mrs. Njebu routinely called all the rooms in the hotel to ascertain those who are still in and those about to check out. After sometime, she saw Nwabufor coming down the stairs. Ms. Njebu asked Nwabufor after calling his room to know if he was still staying. When Nwabufor reached down the stairs, he told her that he would be staying behind but that she should permit him to withdraw money from the ATM to pay for the day. When he told her his girlfriend (referring to Cynthia) was still upstairs, she did not go to check. He was not a regular guest at the hotel. He assured her that his girlfriend was there with the room key. Ms. Njebu told Mr. Nwabufor to return to the hotel before 12 noon, when the payment for their room would expire. He didn't submit the key to her. Olisaeloka came out from the bar and they both left the hotel. She never saw them again. At about 3 p.m. she received a phone call from one of them. The caller said that he was the occupant of the room who left recently and that he was not coming back and he instructed her to remove the "idiot" out of the room. She replied him politely to remind him that, he promised to come back and pay for the day. He said he was not coming back and dropped the call. Ms. Njebu informed the hotel's manager about the development and he assured her that since the caller's girlfriend was still in, she would pay for the room. So, the manager told her to call the room through the intercom. She called many times but no response. The manager went upstairs, knocked several times but didn't get any response. The hotel management directed her to use the master key to access the room, as a last resort. So she went upstairs, knocked again. After, no one responded, she used her master key to open the door. And from the door, she saw Cynthia's lifeless body lying naked on the bed. She was lying horizontal with her legs touching the ground. She screamed with shock and rushed downstairs to inform the manager, who alerted the police.
From the CCTV footage played to her by the police, Ms. Njebu identified Messrs Nwabufo and Olisaeloka.
She was able to recognize the duo when the police brought them to the Area E police station in Festac Town, Lagos.
After the hotel found her body, since her ID cards and mobile phones had been stolen, they could not identify her immediately or call friends and family. Her body was deposited in a morgue in Lagos.

Investigations

All this time, unaware of Cynthia's murder, her family and friends were praying for her safe return. Meanwhile, Cynthia's mother, Mrs. Osokogu, tried calling Cynthia's cell phone for five days but her phone was switched off. On the seventh day, she recalled that one of the men picked her call and told her that Cynthia was sick. Not too long afterwards, they implied that Cynthia had been kidnapped and asked her mother for 20 million Naira ransom. Cynthia's mum asked them if they killed her daughter and they said no, she was just sick and couldn't come to the phone. The phone call was traced to Festac. There, her missing person's police report was submitted to the Area E Command in Festac. This enabled her family to trace her body to the morgue and also led them to the hotel.
The police in Lagos delayed the release Cynthia's body to her parents for burial because they had intended to carry out an autopsy on the body at the Ikeja General Hospital morgue. Police Commissioner Umaru Manko revealed that the pathologist was still working on the autopsy which was  ongoing at the time she was identified. Eventually, her body was released for burial and she was laid to rest in her hometown. A ceremonial burial was performed at the family residence in Boji-Boji Owa, Ika North Local Government Area of Delta State after a requiem mass. The Governor of Delta State, Mr. Emmanuel Uduaghan condoled with the Osokogu family and called on the police to conclude investigation quickly and bring the culprits to book. After Cynthia's murder and investigations progressed through cell phone records and CCTV footages, the police arrested the suspects.

Crime scene
Cynthia's body was found naked with her two hands tied behind her back with a brown tape and supported with a padlocked chain; her two legs were also taped together. Her mouth was stuffed with hair net and handkerchief, also tied with brown tape round her head to seal her mouth and secure the materials inside. There were pin-point holes in her white eyes as well as inside the upper part of her airways and surface of her lungs, a condition described as ‘petechial hemorrhage'. The pathologist also revealed that Cynthia had suffered pulmonary Oedema, an overweight of the lungs from being soaked by blood. Her left and right lungs weighed 400 and 500 grams respectively due to "blood accumulation”, noting that the normal weight would be 250 to 350 grams. The final autopsy stated that Cynthia was asphyxiated; suffocated to death through blockage of air into her lungs. Apart from her death resulting from asphyxia, the pathologist, John Oladapo Obafunwa also observed that she had multiple bruises and abrasions suspected to be from biting. Her autopsy further revealed that a dose of ‘Rohypnol’ sold to the suspects by a pharmacist, Osita Orji, was not responsible for Cynthia's death. After the arrest, several other women came forward to reveal that they had also been drugged, tied up and robbed by the suspects, but they all survived to tell the story. According to reports, these two young men also confessed that they had robbed several other women prior to Cynthia who happened to be their sixth victim. The gang reportedly specializes in luring unsuspecting young women, robbing them of their possessions before killing them. Although there were speculations that their motive was ritualistic, it appeared that it was greed and their main goal was to rob and kill. The specific reason Cynthia was killed was not fully established. The police proposed some theories; Perhaps, the suspects became enraged at the lack of payday after spending so much money to get her there. Or, probably, Cynthia struggled or attempted to scream even after being drugged with the sedative Rohypnol. "She was struggling to see how she could liberate herself or make noise in order to attract people to rescue her"; The investigating officer, FESTAC Area Commander, Dan Okoro said, "But they overpowered her."
The police also stated that it was very likely that the culprits targeted her as they believed she would be carrying large amounts of cash.
She was targeted, because the suspects had figured out that she was the daughter of a retired Army general. They assumed that she would come to Lagos with big cash, a large bank account and jewellery. "At some point they discovered that she came from a very good home and felt that they could make some quick money out of her." But her elder brother, Kenneth, stated that Cynthia never carried any large sums of cash and she never even had an ATM card, she used a checkbook. Several other men were arrested in connection with the crime including the pharmacist who sold the Rohypnol to the suspected killers without a prescription, their driver who always accompanied them during their robberies and a "fence"— the man who sold Cynthia's and the other victims goods.

Trial
About one month after Cynthia was laid to rest, the trial commenced  at Yaba Magistrate court, Lagos on August 27, 2012. Six people were arrested at the beginning of the investigation, they included: Olisaeloka Ezike, 23, and Okwuno Nwabufor, 33; both of whom were identified as the Facebook friends.
Others were Osita Orji, the pharmacist who sold Rohypnol to them and Nonso Ezike, Olisaeloka's brother who assisted in selling the deceased's Blackberry phone. The six-count charge of conspiracy, murder, armed robbery, rape, “unlawful administration of obnoxious substance” and “forceful administration of obnoxious substance” with a view to causing bodily harm were read to them. The trial commenced with the prosecution, the Lagos State Government calling its first witness.
Okwumo Nwabufo and Olisaeloka Ezike were charged with conspiracy to commit murder and felony. Orji Osita, a pharmacist, was charged with negligently selling the Rohypnol Flunitrazepan tablets to Ezike, the 2nd defendant, without a doctor's prescription and without showing due care. Nonso Ezike (Nwabufo's younger brother) was charged with being in possession of the three stolen blackberry mobile phones belonging to the late Cynthia Osokogu.
All the accused  initially pleaded not guilty to all six counts. 
Justice Olabisi Akinlade of the Lagos High Court sitting at Igbosere admitted as evidence,  confessional statements of the culprits recorded in a video. When the first defendant was arrested, he confessed that he knew what he did and that everything was over. The first defendant then operated the Blackberry phone to reveal the chain used in tying his victim. The first defendant was arrested on August 20, 2012, after which he made the confessional statement.
The Attorney General of Lagos State, Mr Ade Ipaye, prosecuted the murder suspects, revealing details of pictures from the crime scene in the court from a laptop. The witness added that he and his team followed the first defendant to his home in Festac and recovered the said laptop, along with some phones and various network SIM cards.
On that same date, the first defendant was asked to open the laptop, which he carried by himself to the Area Commander's office. "Pictures of the deceased lying down and her international passport lying on her chest was revealed”, the witness said.
Another prosecution’s witness testified that from his investigation, it was discovered that the fourth defendant (Nonso) received different stolen phones from the first and second defendants on three occasions. The fourth defendant stole somebody’s receipt in Ladipo Market which he used in selling the deceased’s phone to someone in Port Harcourt and the person was arrested.
The witness also told the court of another investigation against the defendants, in two separate hotels- Chelsea Suit and Penny Hotel,Festac, where they were alleged to have carried out similar acts. The cases were separated because the incidents did not happen on the same day. It was based on the confessional statement by the first and second defendants that they carried out similar acts in other hotels in Festac.
In one of his appearances in court, Nwabufo denied ever knowing about Rohypnol nor did he put it into Cynthia’s drink. He also claimed that Cynthia was his lover and that they were planning to get married before her death.
Nwabufo said he met her at Shoprite Mall in Lekki in 2011 where he went for shopping, while she was also shopping at a fashion shop, dismissing the allegations that they met on Facebook. He also added that when he met her, she was making inquires so he introduced himself to her and she did the same, adding that they exchanged contacts afterwards. He also said that they developed friendship after exchanging addresses and became very close since then. However, there has been no sufficient evidence to warrant this claim. The judge also dismissed the claim by Mr. Nwabufor that Ms. Osokogu was his fiancée and was going to introduce him to her father, saying that the "lover's" story was false because under cross-examination Nwabufor could not tell Cynthia's birthday, the name of her mother, her home town or, in fact, anything about her. Though the convicts pleaded not guilty and tried to withdraw the confessional statements they made to the police claiming they were made under duress, the court admitted the statements they made were corroborated by the testimonies of the witnesses and the evidence provided by the police. The judge said the fact that the police produced a video footage of the convicts making the confessional statements also helped in countering the claim by the convicts that they made the statements under duress.
The court was satisfied that the confessional statements were not given under duress and admitted them in evidence. A confession is sufficient to gain conviction, the judge said.
The confessional statement of the accused is consistent with the state of the body and consistent to the medical evidence. The judge said she would act on it accordingly. While delivering the judgement, the judge said the accused deserved the sentence as they were not remorseful of their action, and were telling the court lies after offering confessional statements to the police. The judge also found the duo guilty on three other counts and sentenced them to a total of 20 years imprisonment each. They were sentenced to 14 years in jail for conspiracy to commit murder, three years for conspiracy to commit felony by stealing, and three years for stealing a Blackberry phone.
The judge acquitted and discharged Osita and Nonso. While delivering the judgement, Mrs. Akinlade said she relied on the evidence and testimonies provided by the prosecution.
She said, having carefully analysed the evidence and testimonies before the court, the prosecution proved beyond reasonable doubt that Messrs. Nwabufor and Ezike murdered Ms. Osokogu.
The judge stated that the evidence of the prosecution remained uncontroverted and relies mainly on the testimonies of witnesses and evidence. It was also very clear that the first defendant was untruthful and deceived the court.
In sentencing both men to death by hanging, the judge said it was no longer relevant to know who, between the two, actually killed Ms. Osokogu.
The second defendant acted in consent with the first defendant and will bear the consequences of their action irrespective of whoever committed the offence.
The Judge held that with its 10 witnesses and 17 exhibits, the prosecution's case against Nwabufo and Ezike was uncontroverted and that the circumstantial evidence brought by the state was “cogent, complete, unequivocal and compelling.” The judge held that the circumstantial evidence brought by the state in proof of the six counts of conspiracy, murder and stealing against the accused persons were cogent, complete, unequivocal and compelling. Counsel for Orji and Nonso had requested bail for their clients and Justice Akinlade had granted bail to Orji with two sureties. The court granted bail to Orji Osita and Ezike Nonso, while the other two who allegedly committed the offence of murder were remanded at the Kirikiri prison, Lagos. For Nonso, Olisaeloka's younger brother, the judge granted him bail with two sureties, adding that one of the sureties must be a civil servant not less than Grade Level 14 while the other must be a property owner with a genuine Certificate of Occupancy. On March 23, 2017, the Lagos state high court, Igbosere, sentenced Nwabufo and Ezike to death by hanging.

Aftermath
Cynthia's murder exposed the dark side of the internet in a way that most people could not imagine. Her mother advised youths to be very cautious of making friends with people that they did not know. She stated “The youths should be very careful, especially when they are making friends in social media. Like we have seen in the case of my daughter, such friends may have ulterior motives."
The police said the incident was a wakeup call to parents to become more vigilant about what their children are involved with while surfing the web. Stricter regulations were proposed for the Federal Government to enforce and restrict the sale of the sedative drug Rohypnol over the counter without the doctor's prescription in Nigeria. The judge's final verdict lifted the hopes of some who had lost interest in the case. Cynthia's story inspired a film adaptation; Murder at Prime Suites, released in 2014.

References

1987 births
2012 deaths
Incidents of violence against women
Rape in Nigeria
Violence against women in Nigeria
People murdered in Lagos
Deaths by strangulation
Robberies in Nigeria
Murdered students
Deaths by person in Africa
Nigerian murder victims
Female murder victims
2012 murders in Nigeria